Marquess of Northampton is a title that has been created twice, firstly in the Peerage of England (1547), then secondly in the Peerage of the United Kingdom (1812). The current holder of this title is Spencer Compton, 7th Marquess of Northampton.

First creation
The title of Marquess of Northampton was created for the first time in the Peerage of England in 1547 in favour of William Parr, brother of Catherine Parr, the sixth and last wife of King Henry VIII. The title was forfeited in 1554 after the accession of Queen Mary but restored in 1559 by Queen Elizabeth I. On Parr's death in 1571, the title became extinct.

Second creation
However, the title is chiefly associated with the Compton family. This family descends from Sir Henry Compton, who in 1572 was summoned to the House of Lords as Baron Compton, of Compton in the County of Warwick. This title was in the Peerage of England. Lord Compton was later one of the peers at the trial of Mary, Queen of Scots. He was succeeded by his son, the second Baron. He served as Lord President of the Marches and of the Dominion of Wales and was also Lord Lieutenant of Warwickshire. In 1618 he was created Earl of Northampton in the Peerage of England.

His son, the second Earl, was a supporter of King James I and served as Master of the Robes to Charles, Prince of Wales (later King Charles I). He fought in the Civil War and was killed at the Battle of Hopton Heath in 1643. He was succeeded by his son, the third Earl. He also fought as a Royalist in the Civil War and notably commanded the cavalry at the First Battle of Newbury in 1643. Lord Northampton was also Lord Lieutenant of Warwickshire and Constable of the Tower of London. His eldest son, the fourth Earl, also served as Constable of the Tower of London and as Lord Lieutenant of Warwickshire.

His eldest son, the fifth Earl, briefly represented Warwick in the House of Commons but in 1711 he was summoned to the House of Lords through a writ of acceleration in his father's junior title of Baron Compton. He married Elizabeth, 15th Baroness Ferrers of Chartley. They had no sons and Lord Northampton was succeeded in the barony of Compton, which could be passed on through female lines, by his daughter Lady Charlotte. The earldom passed to his younger brother, the sixth Earl. He had earlier represented Tamworth and Northampton in Parliament.

He was childless and was succeeded by his nephew, the seventh Earl. He was the son of the Hon. Charles Compton, third son of the fourth Earl. Lord Northampton died childless at an early age and was succeeded by his younger brother, the eighth Earl. He briefly represented Northampton in the House of Commons before he inherited the earldom and also served as Lord Lieutenant of Northamptonshire. His son, the ninth Earl, sat as Member of Parliament for Northampton and served as Lord Lieutenant of Northamptonshire. In 1812 he was created Baron Wilmington, of Wilmington in the County of Sussex, Earl Compton, of Compton in the County of Warwick, and Marquess of Northampton. These titles were in the Peerage of the United Kingdom.

On his death, the titles passed to his son, the second Marquess. He represented Northampton in Parliament but is best remembered as a patron of science and the arts. Between 1838 and 1848 he served as president of the Royal Society. He was also instrumental in helping the new College of Preceptors (College of Teachers) of London receive its Royal Charter. Lord Northampton married Margaret Douglas-Maclean-Clephane, daughter of Major-General Douglas Maclean Clephane. He was succeeded by his eldest son, the third Marquess. In 1831 he assumed by Royal licence the additional and principal surname of Douglas. When he died the titles were inherited by his younger brother, the fourth Marquess. He was an admiral in the Royal Navy. Lord Northampton assumed in 1851 by Royal licence the additional surname of Maclean and in 1878 upon succeeding to the titles that of Douglas.

He was succeeded by his second but eldest surviving son, the fifth Marquess. He represented Stratford-on-Avon and Barnsley in Parliament as a Liberal and served as Lord Lieutenant of Warwickshire. , the titles are held by his grandson, the seventh Marquess, who succeeded his father in 1978.

Other notable members of the Compton family
Several other members of the Compton family have gained distinction. Henry Compton, sixth son of the second Earl of Northampton, was Bishop of London. Spencer Compton, 1st Earl of Wilmington, Prime Minister of Great Britain from 1742 to 1743, was the third son of the third Earl. Catherine Compton, daughter of the Hon. Charles Compton, third son of the fourth Earl, was created Baroness Arden in 1770. She was the wife of John Perceval, 2nd Earl of Egmont, and the mother of another Prime Minister, Spencer Perceval. Lord Alwyne Compton, fourth son of the second Marquess, was Bishop of Ely. Lord Alwyne Compton, third son of the fourth Marquess, was a Unionist politician. He was the father of Captain Edward Robert Francis Compton. The latter married as his first wife Sylvia, daughter of Alexander Haldane Farquharson. Their son Alwyne Arthur Compton was officially recognised by warrant of the Lord Lyon in the surname of Farquharson of Invercauld and as Chief of Clan Farquharson in 1949.

Estates

The Compton family are major land owners. Their two major estates are Castle Ashby House in Northamptonshire and Compton Wynyates in Warwickshire. The family also owns land and property, including the 16th century Canonbury Tower in Islington, north London, where many streets are named after names associated with the family. These include: Alwyne Road/Place/Villas/Square; Bingham Street; Compton Road/Terrace; Douglas Road; Northampton Road/Street/Square; Spencer Street; Percival (formerly Perceval) Street; and Wilmington Square.

Marquesses of Northampton; First creation (1547)
William Parr, 1st Marquess of Northampton (1513–1571) (forfeit 1553; restored 1559; extinct 1571)

Barons Compton (1572)
Henry Compton, 1st Baron Compton (c. 1538-1589)
William Compton, 2nd Baron Compton (died 1630) (created Earl of Northampton in 1618)

Earls of Northampton (1618)
William Compton, 1st Earl of Northampton, 2nd Baron Compton (died 1630)
Spencer Compton, 2nd Earl of Northampton, 3rd Baron Compton (1601–1643)
James Compton, 3rd Earl of Northampton, 4th Baron Compton (1622–1681)
George Compton, 4th Earl of Northampton, 5th Baron Compton (1664–1727)
James Compton, 5th Earl of Northampton, 6th Baron Compton (1687–1754)
George Compton, 6th Earl of Northampton, 7th Baron Compton (1692–1758)
Charles Compton, 7th Earl of Northampton, 8th Baron Compton (1737–1763)
Spencer Compton, 8th Earl of Northampton, 9th Baron Compton (1738–1796)
Charles Compton, 9th Earl of Northampton, 10th Baron Compton (1760–1828) (created Marquess of Northampton, Earl Compton, and Baron Wilmington in 1812)

Marquesses of Northampton; Second creation (1812)
Charles Compton, 1st Marquess of Northampton, 1st Earl Compton, 10th Baron Compton, 1st Baron Wilmington (1760–1828)
Spencer Joshua Alwyne Compton, 2nd Marquess of Northampton, 2nd Earl Compton, 11th Baron Compton, 2nd Baron Wilmington (1790–1851)
Charles Douglas-Compton, 3rd Marquess of Northampton, 3rd Earl Compton, 12th Baron Compton, 3rd Baron Wilmington  (1816–1877)
William Compton, 4th Marquess of Northampton, 4th Earl Compton, 13th Baron Compton, 4th Baron Wilmington (1818–1897)
William George Spencer Scott Compton, 5th Marquess of Northampton, 5th Earl Compton, 14th Baron Compton, 5th Baron Wilmington (1851–1913)
William Bingham Compton, 6th Marquess of Northampton, 6th Earl Compton, 15th Baron Compton, 6th Baron Wilmington (1885–1978)
Spencer Douglas David Compton, 7th Marquess of Northampton, 7th Earl Compton, 16th Baron Compton, 7th Baron Wilmington (born 1946)

The heir apparent is the present holder's son, Daniel Bingham Compton, Earl Compton (born 1973).
The heir apparent's heir presumptive is his son, Henry Douglas Hungerford Compton, Lord Wilmington (born 2018).

 William Compton, 4th Marquess of Northampton (1818–1897)
 William Compton, 5th Marquess of Northampton (1851–1913)
 William Compton, 6th Marquess of Northampton (1885–1978)
 Spencer Compton, 7th Marquess of Northampton (b. 1946)
(1). Daniel Bingham Compton, Earl Compton (born 1973)
(2). Henry Douglas Hungerford Compton, Lord Wilmington (born 2018)
Lord William James Bingham Compton (1947–2007)
(3). James William Compton (b. 1974)
(4). William Edward Richard Compton (b. 2010)
Lord Alwyne Frederick Compton (1855–1911)
Edward Robert Francis Compton (1891–1977)
Robert Edward John Compton (1922–2009)
male issue in succession

Family tree

See also
Baron Compton
Baroness Arden
Earl of Northampton
Earl of Wilmington
 Marquess

Notes

References
Kidd, Charles, Williamson, David (editors). Debrett's Peerage and Baronetage (1990 edition). New York: St Martin's Press, 1990, 

David Beamish's Peerage Page
Cracroft's Peerage

Extinct marquessates in the Peerage of England
Marquessates in the Peerage of the United Kingdom
Marquess
 
 
Noble titles created in 1547
Noble titles created in 1812